CBOM may refer to:

Configurable BOM, a type of bills of materials
CBOM (radio station), a radio station associated with CBO-FM